Rising Sun Country Park is a country park in Benton, North Tyneside, England.

History
Rising Sun Country Park is the former location of a colliery and an isolation hospital for infectious diseases.

Facilities

 
There is a countryside centre offering  forest schools, a cafe, toilets, educational facilities and an exhibition room. There are footpaths, bridleways, bird hides, parking, a picnic and barbecue area, a children's playground and water play area, cycling and Nordic walking groups. Rising Sun Parkrun takes place every Saturday. The area covered is 162 hectares.

Rising Sun Farm
Rising Sun Farm is a charity based at the park which farms 175 acres of land and has pigs, poultry, sheep, a livery yard and a day care centre. 
The farm provides resources for education, learning, recreation and volunteering.

Nature
There is a local nature reserve encompassing Swallow pond which has bird hides and is used for bird watching.

References

External links

Metropolitan Borough of North Tyneside
Parks and open spaces in Tyne and Wear